Peter C. Fatse (born August 3, 1987) is an American professional baseball coach and former player. Graduated from Minnechaug Regional High School in Wilbraham, Massachusetts. Played collegiate baseball at the University of Connecticut and was selected by the Milwaukee Brewers in the 2009 MLB Draft. Served as the MiLB Hitting Coordinator for the Minnesota Twins in 2019. He is currently the hitting coach for the Boston Red Sox of Major League Baseball (MLB).

Biography
Fatse is from Hampden, Massachusetts. He graduated from Minnechaug Regional High School in Wilbraham, Massachusetts, and then enrolled at the University of Connecticut, where he played college baseball for the Connecticut Huskies.

The Milwaukee Brewers selected Fatse in the 24th round of the 2009 MLB draft. He played for the Brewers' organization in Minor League Baseball for two years, as an outfielder, second baseman, and third baseman. He reached the Class A-Advanced level with the Brevard County Manatees in 2010. He then played in independent baseball leagues for another two years, first with the Pittsfield Colonials of the Can-Am League in 2011, then with the Florence Freedom of the Frontier League in 2012. In his four years of professional baseball, Fatse batted .258 in 329 games, with 17 home runs and 170 RBIs.

Fatse founded his own baseball academy, Advanced Performance Academy in Palmer, Massachusetts, in 2010. The Minnesota Twins hired him as their minor league hitting coordinator in January 2019. After the 2019 MLB season, the Boston Red Sox hired him as their assistant hitting coach, which was officially announced on October 31.

He was named Red Sox hitting coach on December 20, 2021.

References

External links

 College baseball statistics at uconnhuskies.com

1987 births
Living people
Sportspeople from Holyoke, Massachusetts
Baseball coaches from Massachusetts
Baseball players from Massachusetts
Major League Baseball hitting coaches
Boston Red Sox coaches
Minor league baseball coaches
UConn Huskies baseball players
Helena Brewers players
Wisconsin Timber Rattlers players
Brevard County Manatees players
Pittsfield Colonials players
Florence Freedom players